Anandhi is a 1965 Indian Tamil-language drama film, directed by P. Neelakantan, and written by M. S. Solaimuthu. The film stars S. S. Rajendran and C. R. Vijayakumari, with M. R. Radha, M. N. Nambiar, Nagesh, Manorama, S. V. Sahasranamam V. K. Ramasamy and Manimala playing supporting roles. It was released on 27 December 1965, and performed averagely.

Plot

Cast 
 S. S. Rajendran as Somu
 C. R. Vijayakumari as Anandhi
 M. R. Radha as Ambalavaanan
 Nagesh as Thambi Durai
 M. N. Nambiar as Nithyanandham
 Manorama as Manoranjitham
 V. K. Ramasamy as Masilamani
 S. V. Sahasranamam as Dharmalingam
 Manimala as Sivakami
 Udaya Chandrika as Dancer

Soundtrack 
Music was composed by M. S. Viswanathan and the lyrics were written by Kannadasan. The song "Kannilae Anbirundhal" is set to the raga Bilaskhani Todi.

References

External links 
 

1960s Tamil-language films
1965 films
Films directed by P. Neelakantan
Films scored by M. S. Viswanathan
Indian black-and-white films